The Jackal is an alias used by several supervillains appearing in American comic books published by Marvel Comics, usually depicted as enemies of the superhero Spider-Man. The original and best known incarnation, Miles Warren, was originally introduced in The Amazing Spider-Man #31 (December 1965) as a professor at the fictional Empire State University. Later storylines established him as also being a scientist researching genetics and biochemistry, and revealed an unhealthy romantic obsession he had for Gwen Stacy. Warren was driven mad with grief and jealousy so he created his Jackal alter-ego to seek revenge on Spider-Man, whom he blamed for Gwen's tragic death. To this end, he trained himself in martial arts, and created a green suit and gauntlets with claw-like razors. Although the Jackal initially didn't possess any superpowers, he later gained enhanced strength, speed and agility by mixing his genes with those of a jackal.  

The Jackal was introduced in The Amazing Spider-Man #129 (February 1974), but his human identity was not revealed until The Amazing Spider-Man #148 (September 1975). Originally one of Spider-Man's less popular rogues, the character rose to prominence after being one of the first in the Marvel Universe to master cloning technology, and creating various clones of Spider-Man, like Ben Reilly and Kaine Parker, as well as of other characters, including himself. His experiments went on to play a major role in several popular Spider-Man storylines, such as the "Clone Saga" (1994-1996), "Spider-Island" (2011), and "Dead No More: The Clone Conspiracy" (2016-2017). 

In 2014, IGN ranked the Jackal as Spider-Man's 17th greatest enemy. The character has been featured in several media adaptations of Spider-Man, including animated series and video games.

Publication history
The character first appears in The Amazing Spider-Man #129 (February 1974), and was created by writer Gerry Conway and artist Ross Andru. In The Amazing Spider-Man #148 (September 1975), the Jackal's identity was revealed to be Professor Miles Warren who first appeared in The Amazing Spider-Man #31 (December 1965), and was created by writer Stan Lee and artist Steve Ditko. Prior to his Jackal reintroduction, his appearances were essentially limited to the occasional cameo in which he acts as simple background to Spider-Man's civilian life as a college student.

When named at all in these early appearances, he is called only "Professor Warren". A "Mister Warren" had previously appeared in The Amazing Spider-Man #8 (January 1964) but he is a high school science teacher rather than a college professor, and is physically very distinct from Miles Warren. Despite this, Conway has said it was always his interpretation that "Mister Warren", "Professor Warren", and Professor Miles Warren/Jackal were the same character.

The character was featured in the controversial 1990s "Clone Saga" story arc, the 2011 storyline "Spider-Island", and the 2016-2017 storyline "Dead No More: The Clone Conspiracy".

Fictional character biography

Miles Warren
Miles Warren was a professor of biology at Empire State University, where he would meet Peter Parker and Gwen Stacy. During his tenure there, Warren becomes secretly infatuated with the much younger Gwen to the point of obsession and jealousy of Parker. After Gwen is murdered by the Green Goblin, Warren swears vengeance on Spider-Man, since it was reported that it was Spider-Man who killed Gwen. Gwen's death drives Warren into depression, despair, and insanity as a mad geneticist who eventually turns into the Jackal. Miles is also the brother of science teacher Raymond Warren of Midtown High School.

Early career
Miles is an assistant of the High Evolutionary at Wundagore Mountain after earning his Ph.D in biochemistry. Warren assists the High Evolutionary in experiments that involve turning animals into humans and vice versa. There is conflict between Warren and the High Evolutionary because Warren succeeds in creating "New Men" who looked practically human, whereas the High Evolutionary is not able to. Eventually, Warren evolves a jackal that exhibits a Jekyll and Hyde personality. When the test subject escapes, the High Evolutionary banishes Warren from Wundagore. Warren continues his research and eventually settles down with a woman named Monica who bears him two children who are all killed in what was originally believed to be a car crash; however, it is later revealed to be an assault by his highly evolved Man-Jackal envious of his creator.

The Jackal's origin
The day after Gwen's death, Warren's lab assistant Anthony Serba reveals he successfully cloned a frog using their research technology. Warren gives Serba tissue samples of Gwen and Peter, telling Serba it's of rat cells. Sometime later, Serba confronts Warren, stating that the clones are human and must be destroyed immediately. Panicking, Warren attempts to cover Serba's mouth to shut up, accidentally suffocating Serba. Unable to accept responsibility for his actions, Warren develops a second personality to carry the weight of his misdeeds dubbed "The Jackal". He further develops his alter ego by fashioning a green suit and gauntlets with sharp, claw-like razors on each finger, and by training himself athletically. During this time, he also continues to experiment with cloning humans. Kaine is the first successful clone of Peter despite suffering from a slow cloning degeneration and having regenerative abilities to elude death several times.

The Jackal's hatred for Spider-Man manifests in his belief that Spider-Man is solely responsible for allowing Gwen, whom he loved, to die at the Goblin's hands. He harasses Spider-Man numerous times, setting Spider-Man up against other adversaries. Warren allies himself with the Punisher against Spider-Man. The Jackal next attempts to incite a gang war between Hammerhead and Doctor Octopus. Later, he equips wrestler Maxwell Markham with the Grizzly costume and powerful exoskeleton to assassinate newspaper publisher J. Jonah Jameson. The Jackal then holds Parker hostage in a scheme to trap Spider-Man. Sometime after, he learns Spider-Man's identity.

Out of his numerous attempts to create clones of Peter, only one is a perfect copy of the original. He also creates two clones of himself, one a direct copy and the other a modified clone harboring the Carrion virus. The Jackal helps the Tarantula (Anton Miguel Rodriguez) escape prison, and the two become partners. The Jackal captures Spider-Man, but promptly lets go after proving that Spider-Man is no match for the Jackal in a fair fight. He then lures his nemesis to Shea Stadium and manipulates into battling his perfect clone of Peter by binding Daily Bugle reporter Ned Leeds to a bomb that only the original Spider-Man can disarm. But when a clone of Gwen tears off the Jackal's mask and confronts him on his crimes, Warren finally accepts responsibility for his actions. He attempts to correct his wrongdoings by freeing Leeds, only to be caught in the bomb's explosion.

Clone Saga

During the "Clone Saga", it was much later revealed that the clone of Peter had survived the explosion and gone into hiding under the alias of Ben Reilly, and the Jackal who died at Shea Stadium was later revealed to be a clone. Nearly five years later, another clone of Jackal would marry the original clone of Gwen and the two would live under the assumed names Warren Miles and Gwen Miles. This clone of Warren eventually died of the clone degeneration that afflicted most of the Jackal's clones. The real Jackal resurfaced, where his experiments mutated his own DNA and give himself an actual jackal's attributes; his physical abilities had previously been the result of training rather than any superhuman powers.

When Reilly returns years later to New York City as the Scarlet Spider and allied with Spider-Man, the Jackal also returned to unleash his clone army and convinced both Parker and Reilly that the latter was the original Spider-Man, and the former was the clone. The Jackal created a number of clones of Peter who came into conflict with Spider-Man, the Scarlet Spider, and Kaine. Ultimately, the Jackal, in the process of attempting to kill and replace millions of people with clones that he could control, was killed falling off a tall building while trying to save the clone of Gwen.

It was ultimately revealed that the Jackal and this storyline's other major players had unknowingly been duped by Norman Osborn. The Jackal and various others (including Kaine) had been tricked into thinking that Reilly was the original and that Peter was the clone. All of the Jackal's machinations were influenced by his incorrect assertion that he knew who the real Peter was.

Spider-Island
The Jackal later returned in the "Spider-Island" storyline, being further genetically altered to the point where he frequently displayed animalistic tendencies. His body is always cold, requiring him to wear a thick fur coat even in the hottest weather. He's now a crime lord calling himself "The Professor", and allied himself with Hammerhead but the two eventually went to jail. He returns in the "Infestation" back-up feature of The Amazing Spider-Man, unleashing genetically-engineered bedbugs to pass on Spider-like abilities to thousands of citizens in Manhattan. He achieved this through the aid of several human clones of himself, and funding from Adriana Soria. Although the bedbugs had later died, the virus gave New York's citizens spider-powers and had now been airborne to infect the world to create a new race of Homo-Arachnus as part of his co-conspirator's plan to overtake the Great Web of Life. The Jackal has also enlisted the aid of his mutated henchman Tarantula. It was revealed that the clone of Gwen introduced in The Amazing Spider-Man #144 was only Abby-L (Gwen's second clone and the first cloning attempt) was a flawed clone with degenerative debilities. Before this seemingly perfect copy of Gwen died at Abby-L's hands, it was revealed the copy actually had some degeneration on her hand, suggesting not being perfect after all. Abby-L was also infected with the Carrion virus and had Carrion's same abilities. Abby-L was manipulated into killing the other clone of Gwen who was living in London under the alias of Joyce Delaney, and coming into conflict with the Jackal and Kaine. With his own ulterior motives, the Jackal manipulated various gang leaders into adorning duplicate costumes of Spider-Man to cause chaos in New York City. He experimented on the Spider King's host form to spread of New York City's infestation on a global scale. The Jackal also reveals that he still knows Spider-Man's true identity despite the worldwide mindwipe to the rest of the world. After a cure was created by Reed Richards with Max Modell's Horizon Labs using Anti-Venom's antibodies, the Jackal assured Soria that no cure was possible to which Soria killed him after realizing his co-conspirator's powers were amplified into the god-like Spider Queen due to a frequency that returned Spider-Man's spider-sense. The aftermath revealed that the one who died was a clone while the real Jackal had kept his distance the entire time with his former self's surviving clones, anticipating the outcome and gaining a sample of his slain female co-conspirator's DNA, recognizing his success in obtaining DNA unbeknownst to the Avengers and Spider-Man.

It's later revealed that the Jackal has been monitoring Peter's accidental creation of Alpha, and has set his sights on Spider-Man's new protégé. The Jackal resurfaces accompanied by his cloned mutated human-spider hybrids of Soria and is bent on harvesting Alpha's powers for himself to clone a race of Alpha males. But his plans fail as the Alpha energy cannot be cloned, resulting in a collection of powerless, near-mindless copies of Alpha, all of which are destroyed when the enraged Alpha breaks free. It was revealed that the two versions of Jackal that Spider-Man and Alpha fought were also clones.

Superior Spider-Man era
When Otto Octavius's mind possessed Spider-Man's body, the X-Men battles a 30 ft. human-spider hybrid attacking New York which turns out to be a human created by the Jackal using Mister Sinister's works. The Jackal later attacks the Superior Spider-Man and the new Scarlet Spider with some mutant-powered spider-clones. Superior Spider-Man kills the clones by destroying the Jackal's hideout, but the Jackal escapes. It is revealed that he kept samples of Scarlet Spider's DNA. The Jackal tells Carrion that he is prepared to develop Spidercide 2.0.

Dead No More: The Clone Conspiracy
Ben's dissolved remains were collected by the Jackal and was resurrected thanks to a new cloning process. However, the Jackal found problems with the cellular degradation. He had Ben killed 26 more times, all of which had Ben's life (and most of Peter's) flash before his eyes. The ordeal of repeated death caused Ben to become mentally unbalanced and morally ambiguous, due to the trauma and very soul being damaged from being removed and replaced over and over. Ben eventually breaks free and knocks out the Jackal. After improving Warren's formula, Ben makes clones of Miles and persuades the Jackal that he is a clone, thereby making it nearly impossible to tell who is the real one. Now free with a number of clone of Miles as servants, Ben acts as the new Jackal during the "Dead No More: The Clone Conspiracy" storyline and is determined to repay the people who have heavily influenced Ben's and Peter's lives with the Jackal's technology to make sure that no one has to suffer again and that those who have can become whole, and even does this by establishing New U Technologies.

When Spider-Man activates the Webware to stabilize the human and clone cells all across the world that were in danger of succumbing to clone degradation, the various clone of Miles melt as Ben fights Doctor Octopus. The so-called clone that does not melt realizes that he is the true Warren and vows to have revenge on Ben as the true Jackal. Ben returns to a safe-house and finds Miles in his Jackal outfit waiting in the living room. The Jackal proceeds to burn Ben's safe-house down and engages in one final battle. Ben defeats the Jackal and leaves him in the burning house to die.

The Jackal however, survived the fire and targeted the neural net that was built by Dr. Yesenia Rosario when the woman was doing a presentation of it at Empire State University. The Jackal was defeated by Spider-Man and Ms. Marvel as Dr. Rosario destroys her own invention by setting it to self-destruct.

He later surfaced in the Empire State University once more, under the guise of "Professor Guarinus" and is shocked to bump into a super-powered counterpart of Gwen Stacy from another universe, who had recently enrolled in this universe's ESU. He injected himself with actual jackal DNA, allowing himself to transform into looking exactly like his iconic green costume but for real. He recruited another new student, Benji, to befriend Gwen in exchange for the possibility of great power if she does her job well and while Benji is able to tell Miles that Gwen is a costumed hero from another world, she somehow had failed Warren and was punished for it.

Ben Reilly

Benjamin "Ben" Reilly is the second major character to use the Jackal alias.

Powers and abilities
Prior to his regeneration, Miles Warren is a genius in the fields of biochemistry, genetics, and cloning. The Jackal was a talented martial artist and gymnast. He later spliced his genes with the DNA of a jackal, having the strength, durability, speed, and agility amplified to inhuman levels. Warren can access to state-of-the-art laboratories, as well as advanced gadgets or devices if needed.

Copies of Jackal
Prior to the death of the Warren clone at Shea Stadium, he had created a clone of himself. The clone remained in stasis within a cloning casket that malfunctioned and super-aged the clone beyond death. Eventually, it emerged and became known as Carrion that wielded power and had no conscience for its actions. He was the first carrier of the Carrion virus, which Warren designed to destroy humanity. Carrion contained all Warren's memories which contained within his RNA, that included his hatred and knowledge of Spider-Man's secret identity. Carrion wielded the power to create a Red Dust that would spread as pestilence as well as his touch that would incapacitate or even cause organic matter to degenerate to the point of disintegration. The original Carrion intended to kill Spider-Man with a spider-amoeba, but failed as Carrion was absorbed by the amoeba, engulfed in flames that ensued from his battle.

Much later, fellow ESU rival Malcolm McBride stumbled across Warren's old lair, where he was infected with a strain of the Carrion virus and became the second incarnation of Carrion. The virus allowed McBride to become endowed with the knowledge of Spider-Man's secret identity; however, he was unsure whether he was Dr. Warren's first clone or Malcolm McBride. Eventually, McBride teamed with the likes of Demogoblin and Carnage, but was later cured of his condition and incarcerated in Ravencroft Asylum.

A man dressed as the Jackal once attacked Alpha Flight and claimed to be Miles Warren's son. It was later indicated that this Jackal was the Ani-Man Warren created that ultimately murdered the Professor's family.

A version of the Jackal dubbed as "The Professor" fought Daredevil and Punisher.

He used multiple stand-ins, such as the clones of his human form and the Jackal in "Spider-Island". There was also an additional clone accompanying the Jackal in "Sibling Rivalry" after targeting the Superior Spider-Man and Scarlet Spider.

Ben Reilly later made clones of Miles Warren to help run New U Technologies.

Other Clones
The following clones were created by the Jackal:

 The clone of Miles Warren who died at Shea Stadium in The Amazing Spider-Man #149.
 The clone of Miles Warren who married the clone of Gwen Stacy and died of clone degeneration in Web of Spider-Man #125.
 The clone of Miles Warren in the Daredevil/Punisher limited series.
 The original clone of Miles Warren who is Carrion.
 The clone of Gwen Stacy introduced in The Amazing Spider-Man #144. She went by the aliases Joyce Delaney and Gwen Miles.
 Abby-L - The original clone of Gwen who is also infected with the Carrion virus; introduced in Spider Island: Deadly Foes.
 The clone of Gwen introduced in The Amazing Spider-Man #399 who dies of clone degeneration.
 Ben Reilly a.k.a. the Scarlet Spider/Spider-Man - A clone of Peter Parker.
 Kaine Parker a.k.a. the Tarantula/Scarlet Spider - The first clone of Peter Parker who suffers from clone degeneration.
 Spidercide - A clone of Peter who has control over his own molecules, used by the Jackal, like Jack and Guardian, as muscle. Died fighting Ben Reilly and Peter above the Daily Bugle before falling to its death.
 Jack - A clone of Peter who was the Jackal's diminutive henchman, armed with claw-like fingernails (much like Guardian) who dies from clone degeneration.
 Guardian - A clone of Peter with dense skin, super-strength, and claw-like fingernails who guarded the entrance to one of the Jackal's headquarters who also died of clone degeneration.
 The clone of Spider-Man whose skeleton was found in the smokestack that Ben Reilly was dumped down at the original Clone Story's end.
 The army of clones of Spider-Man in Maximum Clonage.
 The various clones of his human form featured in Spider-Island. Most, in human form, acted as henchmen for the Jackal and Adriana Soria. Two later kidnapped Alpha and his family which Spider-Man fought.
 The Spider clones that were harvested from Adriana Soria's DNA sent to fight Spider-Man.
 The Alpha clones created to harvest/clone the Parker Particles.
 Using the works of Mister Sinister, the Jackal created a clone that was a girl who can turn into a mutant spider. This girl can shoot mucus from her mouth and shoot optic blasts when in spider form. When the girl was defeated by Superior Spider-Man and Storm, she was taken into the X-Men's custody.
 The Jackal then used the DNA samples of the X-Men that he obtained from one of Mister Sinister's laboratories to create mutant-powered spider-clones. One clone has optic blasts like Cyclops, one clone can use electrical attacks like Storm, one clone can teleport like Nightcrawler, and the final clone can do cryokinesis like Iceman. These mutant-powered spider-clones were killed when Superior Spider-Man blew up the Jackal's hideout.

Reception
J. M. DeMatteis, the creator of the "Clone Saga", claimed in an interview that he thought Jackal is "a terrific villain...one of his favorites", and that it "was a blast bringing the character back, if only for this one story." Dan Slott claimed in an interview with Newsarama about the "Spider-Island" saga that the Jackal is "one of the wonderful mad scientists of Spider-Man's world."

Other versions

Marvel Zombies
In the Marvel Zombies universe, when the Zombie Galacti left the Earth (after eating Galactus), Wilson Fisk (Kingpin) makes an empire. The zombiefied Jackal plays an important part in it, creating human clones to feed the remaining Marvel Zombies. This process utilizes Inhuman technology.

Spider-Man: Clone Saga
Jackal appears in the re-imagining of the Clone Saga by Tom DeFalco, who was exploring the storyline as it was originally conceived. He infects both May Parker and Mary Jane Watson with a genetic virus. When Kaine betrays Jackal and leads Spider-Man and Scarlet Spider to his lair, all three are captured. The Jackal then reveals his plan to create an army of Spider-Clones to take over the world and clone Gwen Stacy. The clones prove unstable, however, and the Jackal comes to the conclusion that Ben is the original. Before he can do anything, Kaine breaks free and burns his mark onto the Jackal's face before breaking his neck.

Ultimate Marvel
The Ultimate Marvel version of Miles Warren is a hypnotherapist for Harry Osborn to help repress memories about the Green Goblin. Later in the Deadpool story arc of Ultimate Spider-Man, he was revealed to be dating May Parker. Additionally, his Clone Saga involvement has been taken over by Doctor Octopus. He last appeared when May tried to introduce him to Peter, but they had to leave town because of Norman Osborn and he had a patient to handle.

Spider-Man: Life Story
Spider-Man: Life Story features an alternate continuity where the characters naturally age after Peter Parker becomes Spider-Man in 1962. After the 60s, Miles eventually leaves Empire State and forms his own bio-engineering company. Peter Parker's wife, Gwen Stacy, became his chief biologist. During this time, he was also hired by Norman Osborn to create clones of Norman and Peter, but he also secretly created a clone of Gwen. In 1977, Norman gets word of Warren's additional clone and sends Harry Osborn as the Black Goblin to attack Warren's company, revealing the clones to Harry, Peter, and Gwen in the process. Harry blows up the containment tubes containing the clones, which kills all of them except for Peter's clone. However, Warren reveals that the "Gwen" that Peter was with was actually her clone, while the real Gwen died in the explosion, as he wanted to keep her for himself.

Spider-Verse
In the Spider-Verse storyline, the Miles Warren of Earth-802 is one of the top scientists working for Jennix of the Inheritors. Jennix once quoted to Miles "I keep you around because you were once the most brilliant mind on the planet." Spider-Man of Earth-94, Scarlet Spider, and Black Widow of Earth-1610 later encounter Miles Warren when they infiltrate the Baxter Building to disable Jennix' cloning device (which is used to create new bodies for the Inheritors if they get killed in action).

Secret Wars
During the Secret Wars storyline, Spider-Gwen encounters the Jackal of Arachnia and covers him with webbing as he is robbing a grave after which he exclaims he is the best geneticist of his generation.

What If?
In "What If The Punisher Had Killed Spider-Man?", Warren successfully dupes the Punisher into killing Spider-Man and abandons him to take the fall in his place. Being a hunted fugitive, the Punisher eventually hunts Warren down and intends to surrender him to the police. But when the NYPD is about to arrest him instead, threatening to kill him should he shoot Warren, Warren is executed (off-panel) by the Punisher after the latter gleefully concludes the story with the words: "See you on the other side, Jackal."

Dead No More: The Clone Conspiracy
When Warren reveals his plans for New U, Kaine and the Gwen Stacy of Earth-65 step in to stop him from winning Peter to his side. Kaine later told Spider-Man that they have visited various unidentified alternate universes where Peter agreeing to Jackal's plans for New U Technologies have led to catastrophe in the form of the Carrion Virus.

In other media

Television
 Miles Warren appeared in the Spider-Man: The Animated Series two-part episode "The Return of Hydro-Man", voiced by Jonathan Harris. This version is a scientist whose cloning experiments were banned by the government. In an attempt to stabilize his clones, he uses a sample from Hydro-Man and creates clones of him and Mary Jane Watson. Despite being discovered by Spider-Man and his clones evaporating, Warren retrieves a sample of Spider-Man's DNA with the intention of cloning him as well.
 An alternate universe version of Warren appears in the series finale "I Really, Really Hate Clones", in which he captures and clones Peter Parker and tampers with both versions' memories, with one taking on the Scarlet Spider alias and the other later turning into Spider-Carnage.
 Miles Warren appears in The Spectacular Spider-Man, voiced by Brian George. This version is East Indian. While conducting research at the ESU labs with a grant from Norman Osborn, Warren turns Kraven the Hunter into a leonine creature and Mark Allan into Molten Man and blackmails Doctors Curt and Martha Connors into moving away so he can take their lab for himself.
 A variation of the Jackal appears in Spider-Man as the alter ego of Raymond Warren (voiced by John DiMaggio). This version mixed his own DNA with that of his namesake and has mastered cloning technology, creating numerous clones of himself in case he is ever exposed or caught.

Video games
The Jackal appears as a boss in the PS2 and PSP versions of Spider-Man: Web of Shadows, voiced by Greg Baldwin.

References

External links
 Jackal at Marvel.com

Characters created by Gerry Conway
Characters created by Ross Andru
Characters created by Stan Lee
Characters created by Steve Ditko
Clone characters in comics
Comics characters introduced in 1965
Comics characters introduced in 1974
Fictional biochemists
Fictional characters from New York City
Fictional characters with superhuman durability or invulnerability
Fictional genetically engineered characters
Fictional geneticists
Fictional prison escapees
Fictional professors
Marvel Comics characters who can move at superhuman speeds
Marvel Comics characters with superhuman strength
Marvel Comics hybrids
Marvel Comics martial artists
Marvel Comics mutates
Marvel Comics scientists
Marvel Comics supervillains
Spider-Man characters